"The End of the Game" is a song by the American rock band Weezer, released on September 10, 2019, as the first single from their fifteenth studio album Van Weezer. A music video for the song was released the same day, starring American rock band Cherry Glazerr, although they are not featured on the song. The band performed the song at Jimmy Kimmel Live! the same day the song was released.

Composition
According to Weezer frontman Rivers Cuomo, "The End of the Game" contains at least 100 guitar overdubs. The song has been categorized as alternative rock, power pop, hard rock, and pop metal.

Critical reception
The A.V. Club writer Gwen Ihnat wrote "for those who prefer their Weezer less mellow, more rocking, it's the band's best song in years". Ihnat added "If the rest of Van Weezer sounds as joyously rocking as this keg-stand soundtrack, it could make Pinkerton an even more distant memory (blasphemy, we know). This is the kind of music the sign of the devil was made for, so enjoy."

Charts

Weekly charts

Year-end charts

References

2019 singles
2019 songs
Songs written by Rivers Cuomo
Weezer songs
Songs written by Tim Pagnotta
American hard rock songs